A pothole is a surface disruption in a roadway, caused by fatigue and erosion.

Pothole may also refer to:

A small deep hole dug to look for buried public utilities, see vacuum excavation
Pothole (geology), a phenomenon encountered in the platinum mining industry in South Africa
Pothole (landform), evorsion, swirlhole, or giant's kettle, a smooth, bowl-shaped or cylindrical hollow created by water erosion of bedrock
Pothole, or panhole, a shallow solution basin, or closed depression, found on flat or gently sloping rock
Pothole, a shallow depression, often containing an intermittent pond or marsh and serving as a nesting place for waterfowl in the Prairie Pothole Region of North America
Pothole, or pit cave, a predominantly vertical cave system
The Pothole (Seinfeld)

See also 
Potholes, California
Potholes (film), a 1928 Soviet silent film
Pothole, the upper section of Bull Shoals Lake, Missouri
Potholes Reservoir, Washington state
Potholing, or caving, spelunking